The Institute of Chartered Accountants of Pakistan (ICAP) is a professional accountancy body in Pakistan. As of 2022, it has over 8,000 members working in and outside Pakistan. The institute was established on July 1, 1961 to regulate the profession of accountancy in Pakistan. It is a statutory autonomous body established under the Chartered Accountants Ordinance, 1961. With the significant growth in the profession, the CA Ordinance and By-Laws were revised in 1983.

The course of ICAP involves a blend of theoretical education and practical training which runs for a period of approximately 6 years and equips a student with knowledge, ability, skills and other qualities required of a professional accountant.

The course of CA by ICAP involves 4 stages named PRC, CAF, CFAP and MSA. PRC stage has 5 papers, CAF stage has 2 groups (group A and group B) 4 papers in group A and 4 papers in group B, CFAP stage has 6 papers and MSA stage has 2 papers but in-between after CAF stage there is a period of articleship of 3.5 years.

The head office of the institute is in Clifton, Karachi where it has its own premises. The institute also has regional offices at Lahore, Islamabad, Peshawar, Multan, Gujranwala, Sukkur, Quetta, Mirpur, Faisalabad, Abbottabad and Hyderabad.

History

1850–1881
In the Indian subcontinent there were a few British firms of accountants, but they were so busy that their services were not available to the general public. The public companies used to appoint a European auditor for safeguarding the interests of the European shareholders, and an Indian auditor with the objectives of safeguarding the interests of the Indian shareholders. The audit of financial statements were conducted under the Companies Act 1850.

1882–1913
Then the Companies Act of 1885 was passed. Regulations 83–94 of Table A contained in the First Schedule provided for the audit of accounts of the companies adopting that table and for the appointment, remuneration and duties of the auditors. In those times, it was not necessary for an auditor to be a qualified accountant and companies used to employ lawyers as their auditors.

1913–1932

On 1 April 1914, the Companies Act, 1913 was passed and it was necessitated that every auditor of a public limited company must be a certified auditor by the government. The provincial governments were empowered to grant auditors' certificates but, at the same time, the central government also reserved the right to recognise members of certain professional bodies as qualified auditors without obtaining an Auditor's Certificate from the government. Consequently, the members of the English, Scottish, and Irish Institutes of Chartered Accountants and the English Society of Incorporated Accountants and Auditors were recognised as qualified auditors.

At that time there was no provision of any kind for the training and examination of the accountants. The government of Bombay was the first provincial government to take a constructive step in the direction of organising the profession. In 1918, it instituted the Government Diploma in Accountancy called GDA and made regulations for the examination and training of those who wanted to obtain that Diploma and certificate to practise.

An Accountancy Board was set up by the Government and was attached to the Sydenham College of Commerce and Economics, Bombay. This functioned till 1932. The Board was required to register apprenticeships and conduct the required examinations. The successful candidates were granted the GDA Diploma and they could practise if they had previously received training as apprentices with a practising accountant. The Accountancy Board was also required to advise the Government on all matters relating to accountancy and the Government.

1932–1947
In 1932, the Government framed rules under Section 144 of the companies Act, 1913, called Auditors' Certificates Rules, 1932. The objectives of the rules, broadly, were to register apprenticeships, to conduct examinations, and to control and regulate the profession of auditing. The accountancy profession was then being supervised and controlled by the Ministry of Commerce of the Central Government. With a view to helping the Government in discharging the necessary responsibilities with respect to the accountancy profession, the Indian Accountancy Board was established. The Board consisted of officials and practising accountants nominated by the Government. Later, in 1939, the appointment of a majority of the members on the Board was made on the elective principle. The Board was only an advisory body. The Auditors' Certificates Rules, 1932, required the passing of two examinations – Registered Accountants first and final. It further laid down the tenure of the prescribed training which was required to be completed during the period of apprenticeship. Provisions meant to regulate and control the profession were also contained therein.

1947–1984
After independence, Pakistan adopted the Auditors' Certificates Rules 1932 with certain amendments in 1950, and thus the auditing profession was administered under the Auditors' Certificates Rules, 1950. The Rules of 1950 were generally based on the old rules with some amendments incorporated therein. A person who passed the Registered Accountants first and final examinations and who satisfied the Ministry of Commerce, Central Government of Pakistan that he had completed the prescribed practical training could have his name placed on the register maintained by the said Ministry and was entitled to use the designation 'Registered Accountant' (RA). The Companies Act, 1913, as adapted by Pakistan allowed only a Registered Accountant to act as the auditor of a public limited company, although his services could also be utilised for the audit of private companies, partnership, etc.

In 1952, the Registered Accountants formed a private body known as 'Pakistan Institute of Accountants' with the object of looking after their own interest and taking up with the Ministry of Commerce, Government of Pakistan, matters affecting the accountancy profession.

In June 1959 the Department of Accountancy was established in the Ministry of Commerce with a Controller of Accountancy to deal with the profession instead of a Section Officer.

During this period, an advisory body called the 'Council of Accountancy' was set up under Auditors' Certificates Rules, 1950 and recommended the establishment of the Institute of Chartered Accountants in Pakistan. The Government accepted the recommendations and the Department of Accountancy assisted by the officials of the Institute and a number of its members prepared the Draft Ordinance to be passed.

Kanika Jenson, 1961, received the assent of the President of Pakistan, Field Marshal General Ayub Khan on March 3, 1961 and was published in Part 1 of the Extraordinary Gazette of Pakistan on March 10, 1961. The Institute of Chartered Accountants of Pakistan came into being on July 1, 1961. A draft of the Chartered Accountants By-Laws was also prepared and published for inviting public comments. The amended version called the Chartered Accountants By-Laws, 1961 was published in Part 1 of the Extraordinary Gazette of Pakistan on July 1, 1961 and was enforced on that date. As of that date the Department of Accountancy and the Pakistan Institute of Accountants having served a very useful purpose for a long time were finally liquidated.

The Chartered Accountants By-Laws provided for the formation of regional committees to look after the interests of their members. The members are divided into two classes – namely, Associate Chartered Accountants (ACA) and Fellow Chartered Accountants (FCA).

1984 to present
In December 1984, the Companies Act, 1913 was replaced by the Companies Ordinance, 1984 with an order by the President of Pakistan General Zia-ul-Haq. With this Ordinance, it was also necessitated for the manufacturing concern to prepare and maintain cost accounting records and to arrange
cost audit on annual basis by a Chartered Accountant or a Cost and Management Accountant. It also lays down the requirements for the preparation of financial statements of unlisted companies. For listed companies the above Ordinance also made mandatory the National Accounting Standards (NAS) and other standards to be strictly followed while preparing financial statements.

Keeping in view the convergence, undergone by the major economies of the world such as United States of America, China and Canada, of the International Financial Reporting Standards with respective local GAAP, the demand for IFRS specialists is increasing. The Institute of Chartered Accountants of Pakistan (ICAP) has introduced a diploma in IFRS to prepare the candidates to avail such opportunities.

Presidents
The following is a list of presidents of the institute:

Council members and government nominees 
The ICAP Council governs the Institute under the provisions of the Chartered Accountant Ordinance, 1961 and the CA by-laws. The Council has a four-year term, and consists of 19 members: 15 members elected by chartered accountants among themselves, and four nominated by the Federal government. As of 2022, Council members of the Institute are as follows:

Office bearers 

 Ashfaq Yousuf Tola, FCA (President)
 Husnain R. Badami, FCA (Vice President)
 Saifullah, FCA (Vice President)

Council members 

 Arslan Khalid, FCA
 Asad Feroze, FCA
 Farrukh Rehman, FCA
 Hina Usmani, FCA
 Khalid Rahman, FCA
 Khursheed Kotwal
 M. Ali Latif, FCA
 Mohammad Maqbool, FCA
 Muhammad Awais, FCA
 Muhammad Samiullah Siddiqui, FCA
 Shahab Qadir, FCA
 Zeeshan Ijaz, FCA

The current government nominees are:
Aamir Khan
DR.Inayat Hussain
Feroz Rizvi, FCA
Muhammad Najam Ali

Members 
As of 30 June 2021, ICAP had 8,889 active members, out of which 2,252 (25%) were overseas. The active membership included 3,748 Fellow members (FCA) and 5,141 Associate members (ACA). Compared to the previous year, the organization saw a 0.60% increase in membership (8,836 on 30 June 2020).

Overseas members

Evolution of membership

Students
From 1994, a Pre-entry Proficiency Test (PPT) was introduced to determine the suitability of candidates before being registered as Trainee Students/Full Time Students. PPT was mandatory for all entrants except those who were exempt from PPT but later when a new policy was introduced in 2014, it was completely excluded from the course.

Publications
The publications of the Institute are:
 An Inspiring Journey of CA Women
 Coffee Table Book
 Newsletter
 The Pakistan Accountant
 MIES 
 Technical e-Newsletter

The Pakistan Accountant is the professional flagship publication of the Institute. It is intended to serve as a forum for disseminating information on auditing and accounting practices, business and finance, and topics of current national and international interest.

Through the Members Information & Education Series (MIES) the Institute hopes to promote the integration of best practices and sound judgment among members.

These publications form the body of literature that fosters the Institute's policy of promoting education and research.

International affiliations
The ICAP is a member of: 
International Federation of Accountants (IFAC) 
International Accounting Standards Board (IASB)
Confederation of Asian and Pacific Accountants (CAPA)
South Asian Federation of Accountants (SAFA)
Chartered Accountants Worldwide (CAW), making it the second professional body to be admitted to the organisation since its launch in February 2013.

Overseas offices
ICAP has two full overseas centers, one in Dubai and the other one in Riyadh, where students can appear in exams.

See also
Association of Chartered Certified Accountants
International Federation of Accountants
Institute of Cost and Management Accountants of Pakistan
Pakistan Institute of Public Finance Accountants
Securities and Exchange Commission of Pakistan

Notes

References
 Saeed, Prof. Dr. Khawaja Amjad (1993), Auditing: Principles and Procedures, Lahore: Institute of Business Management.
 ICAP Coffee Table Book, A journey through time, And it can be viewed using this link, http://www.icap.org.pk/wp-content/uploads/CoffeeTable/CTB/index.html#p=14

Professional associations based in Pakistan
Accounting in Pakistan
Pakistan federal departments and agencies
1961 establishments in Pakistan
Government agencies established in 1961
Member bodies of the International Federation of Accountants